Yvon Godin (born May 12, 1955) is a Canadian politician.

Godin was a New Democratic Party (NDP) Member of Parliament (MP) in the House of Commons of Canada, representing the riding of Acadie—Bathurst from 1997 until his retirement in 2015. Previously, Godin was a labour representative for the United Steelworkers. He was the NDP critic for Labour and Official Languages in his last term in parliament.

In 2003, he supported Bill Blaikie's campaign to lead the NDP.

Involvement with the New Brunswick NDP

As federal MP, Godin had a strained relationship with former New Brunswick New Democratic Party leader Elizabeth Weir.  Following her resignation in 2005, however, there were rumours that Godin might resign his federal seat and run to replace her as provincial party leader at the party's 2005 leadership convention. Ultimately, Godin declined to stand as a candidate, and Allison Brewer was elected NB NDP leader.

Following a poor showing in the 2006 New Brunswick provincial election, Brewer also resigned, and there were renewed rumours Godin would seek the leadership.  However Godin demurred again, instead endorsing former priest Roger Duguay. Duguay had run in the provincial riding of Miramichi Bay-Neguac in the last provincial election, and received 26.2% of the vote, the best showing of any NDP candidate. The Miramichi Bay-Neguac riding overlaps with Godin's federal riding.  Duguay was subsequently elected leader at the party's October 13, 2007 leadership convention but resigned after a disappointing result in the 2010 provincial election

Godin also had a strained relationship with Duguay's successor, Dominic Cardy. Following the 2014 provincial election, Godin criticized Cardy's leadership saying that Cardy had moved the provincial party too far to the centre. "The problem, I think, with the provincial party, with Dominic, was that I think he was too much to the right to even be in the centre, and I think people read into that," said Godin who added: "I think it did hurt the party. People were looking for the NDP, they were doing really well, and [voters] wanted change from the existing parties that we have now, who are serving the big corporations and forgetting about the people. I think that's what happened." Cardy retorted by accusing Godin of failing to involve himself in the development of the provincial party's platform, saying "He's never been to a provincial party meeting during my time as leader."

Claim of breached privilege

In September 2014, Godin claimed that his privileges as a Member were breached when he was delayed in accessing the Parliamentary precinct during an official visit by German President Joachim Guack. In a committee meeting on October 21, video evidence was presented that showed Godin was delayed in crossing the street by just 70 seconds. In response, Godin demanded to know whether the video had been sped up.

Electoral record

References

External links
 

1955 births
Acadian people
Living people
Canadian trade unionists
Members of the House of Commons of Canada from New Brunswick
New Democratic Party MPs
People from Bathurst, New Brunswick
United Steelworkers people
21st-century Canadian politicians